Samuel Ocran (born September 16, 1986, in Ghana) is a Ghanaian footballer who plays for UAE Pro-League club Dibba Al Fujairah.

External links
 Samuel Ocran at playmakerstats.com (formerly thefinalball.com)

1986 births
Living people
El Gouna FC players
Ghanaian footballers
All Blacks F.C. players
Dibba FC players
UAE Pro League players
Egyptian Premier League players
Ghanaian expatriate footballers
Expatriate footballers in Egypt
Ghanaian expatriate sportspeople in Egypt
Association football midfielders